Aysenia is a genus of South American anyphaenid sac spiders first described by Albert Tullgren in 1902.

Species
 it contains nine species from Chile and Argentina:
Aysenia araucana Ramírez, 2003 – Chile
Aysenia barrigai Izquierdo & Ramírez, 2008 – Chile, Argentina
Aysenia cylindrica Ramírez, 2003 – Chile, Argentina
Aysenia elongata Tullgren, 1902 – Chile, Argentina
Aysenia grismadoi González & Ramírez, 2012 – Chile
Aysenia huayun González & Ramírez, 2012 – Chile
Aysenia izquierdoi González & Ramírez, 2012 – Chile
Aysenia paposo Laborda, Ramírez & Pizarro-Araya, 2013 – Chile
Aysenia segestrioides Ramírez, 2003 – Chile

References

Anyphaenidae
Araneomorphae genera
Spiders of South America